The annual edition of the Pickurflick Indie Film Festival, started in 2017, has been renamed as Pondicherry International Film Festival (PIFF). The festival aims to showcase independent cinema from across the globe, celebrate the true spirit of indie filmmaking, and provide a platform where Indie filmmakers can showcase & get recognition for their work. The inaugural edition received more than 550 films from 50 countries, out of which 170 films were selected. Screenings were held at Bangalore & Delhi from March to May 2017 with awards given across 12 categories. Pickurflick Indie Film Festival is an IMDb qualifying event and has been rated amongst the top unconventional film festivals in India.

PIFF-2018 is scheduled to take place 26–30 September at Alliance Francaise Pondicherry and other venues. It would showcase 100 films from over 25 countries. And would include panel discussions, open forums, and master classes. Besides film screenings, the five-day film festival will also conduct art, culture exhibition, food festival and music concerts to celebrate art, entertainment and travel in Puducherry, which was a French colony. The focus would be on French cinema, art, and culture; independent Tamil cinema; and independent regional cinema. The festival is organised by Pickurflick, a global distribution platform for indie filmmakers. It is supported by the Puducherry Tourism Department. Actor Adil Hussain is the brand ambassador. And France is the partner country.

Festival committee 

 Abhishek Sinha - Founder & CEO

Award categories 

 Best Short Film
 1st Runner Up (Short Film)
 Best Feature Film
 Best Director (Feature)
 Best Cinematography (Feature)
 Best Screenplay (Feature)
 Best Editing (Feature)
 Best Documentary
 1st Runner Up (Documentary)
 Best Animation Short
 1st Runner Up (Animation)

References

External links 

 PIFF website

Film festivals in India
Pondicherry (city)
2017 establishments in Puducherry
Film festivals established in 2017